Kostelec u Heřmanova Městce is a municipality and village in Chrudim District in the Pardubice Region of the Czech Republic. It has about 400 inhabitants.

Administrative parts
The village of Tasovice is an administrative part of Kostelec u Heřmanova Městce.

References

External links

Villages in Chrudim District